Henry John Horstman Fenton (18 February 1854 – 13 January 1929) was a British chemist who, in the 1890s, invented Fenton's reagent, a solution of hydrogen peroxide and an iron catalyst that is used to oxidize contaminants or waste waters. Fenton's reagent can be used to destroy organic compounds such as trichloroethylene (TCE) and tetrachloroethylene (PCE).

Born in London, Henry Fenton was educated at Magdalen College School, King's College London and Christ's College, Cambridge. He became the university demonstrator in Chemistry at Cambridge in 1878, and was University Lecturer in Chemistry from 1904 to 1924.

Works
Outlines of Chemistry
Notes on Qualitative Analysis

See also
 Environmental remediation

External links 
 Biography of Fenton from Krzysztof Barbusiński, 2009

Notes

1854 births
1929 deaths
People educated at Magdalen College School, Oxford
Alumni of King's College London
Alumni of Christ's College, Cambridge
English chemists
Fellows of the Royal Society